TVB Jade, or simply Jade, is a Hong Kong Cantonese-language free-to-air television channel owned and operated by Television Broadcasts Limited (TVB) as its flagship service, alongside its sister network, the English-language TVB Pearl. Broadcasting started on 19 November 1967. It is headquartered at TVB City at the Tseung Kwan O Industrial Estate in Tseung Kwan O, in the Sai Kung District. Primarily broadcasting entertainment programming, TVB Jade has historically been the most dominant television channel in the region in terms of viewership, with its closest competitor having been the now-defunct ATV Home.

Jade primarily broadcasts in the Cantonese language; it has also offered programs with alternative audio tracks in Mandarin, English, and other foreign languages. Some shows also offer subtitles in multiple languages.

Audience
During the 21:30 to 22:30 weekday time-slot, TVB Jade consistently attains the highest television audience ratings in Hong Kong. With an average of a '32' ratings point in that time-slot, it is watched by more than 80% of the TV audience in Hong Kong.

Digital broadcasting
TVB Jade was launched on DVB-T2 digital terrestrial television on 31 December 2007, using digital virtual channel 81.

Overseas broadcasting

Mainland China
Due to the needs of reform and opening up, TVB Jade was broadcast by some cable providers in Guangdong in the 1990s, and officially obtained the right to broadcast legally in Guangdong Province in September 2004. After ATV Home stopped broadcasting, TVB Jade became the only overseas Cantonese TV channel that could legally broadcast in Guangdong Province.

Some programmes broadcast on TVB Jade will be censored by Guangdong authorities (like some pre-2020 RTHK-produced political and current affairs programmes, "sensitive" news clips, or TVB dramas that was banned by the mainland authorities) and they will insert some entertainment programmes, their own advertisements or Hong Kong Government's promotional clips instead.

During the "National Day of Mourning", access to TVB channels (Jade and Pearl) was blocked and some cable providers in Guangdong switched their Jade and Pearl feeds to CCTV-1, but Guangdong Cable only blocked Jade's and Pearl's entertainment programmes and advertisements.

United States

Australia, Canada and Europe

Southeast Asia

TVB Jade Malaysia and TVB Jade Southeast Asia is a pay television channel owned by Television Broadcasts Limited. It was first launched on Astro on 1 May 2016. As a main general news and entertainment television channel, it broadcasts in both Cantonese and Mandarin. It simulcasts Hong Kong TVB Jade primetime slot, including live events. TVB Jade Malaysia and TVB Jade Southeast Asia also features variety shows and newscasts (in simulcast from Hong Kong). Starting 1 April 2020, TVB Jade Malaysia and TVB Jade Southeast Asia will merge with some of the Wah Lai Toi content and due to this Astro Wah Lai Toi will transition to be exclusively available via Video on Demand.

TVB Jade Malaysia and TVB Jade Southeast Asia has organized the satellite service into two zones with each having a different localized schedule:

TVB Jade Malaysia – Broadcasts to Malaysia
TVB Jade Southeast Asia – Broadcasts to Singapore

See also
Television Broadcasts Limited
TVB Pearl
TVB J2

References

External links
 

Jade
TVB original programming
Television channels and stations established in 1967
Chinese-language television stations
Television stations in Hong Kong